CFG may stand for:

 Canada's Food Guide, a diet planning document produced by Health Canada
 Characteristic function game, in cooperative game theory
 China Film Group, a Chinese film studio
 City Football Group, a multinational sporting organisation owning and controlling a number of football clubs
 Citizens Financial Group, a regional US financial institution
 Condor (airline) (ICAO: CFG), a German charter airline based in Frankfurt
 Configuration file, a file used to configure the initial settings for some computer programs
 Consortium for Functional Glycomics, a research initiative to study carbohydrate-protein interaction
 Context-free grammar, in computer science, a grammar that naturally generates a formal language
 Control-flow graph, in computer science, a representation of all paths that might be traversed through a program during its execution
 Jaime González Airport (IATA: CFG), an international airport that serves the city of Cienfuegos, Cuba

See also
 CFGS (disambiguation)